Alessandro Russo (born 31 March 2001) is an Italian professional footballer who plays as a goalkeeper for Sassuolo.

Club career
Russo is a youth product of Carmine Coppola, F24 Messina, and Genoa. On 12 September 2019, Russo signed with Sassuolo. Russo made his professional debut with Sassuolo in a 2-1 Coppa Italia loss to Perugia on 4 December 2019.

On 29 August 2020, he went to Virtus Entella on loan.

On 15 July 2021, he joined Alessandria on loan. On 24 January 2022, he moved on a new loan to Sint-Truiden in Belgium.

Personal life 
On 12 October 2020, he tested positive for COVID-19. He tested negative 18 days later.

References

External links

 FIGC U16
 FIGC U17
 FIGC U18
 FIGC U19

2001 births
Living people
Sportspeople from Reggio Calabria
Italian footballers
Footballers from Calabria
Association football goalkeepers
Italy under-21 international footballers
Italy youth international footballers
Serie B players
Belgian Pro League players
U.S. Sassuolo Calcio players
Virtus Entella players
U.S. Alessandria Calcio 1912 players
Sint-Truidense V.V. players
Italian expatriate footballers
Italian expatriate sportspeople in Belgium
Expatriate footballers in Belgium